Kenyan migration to the United Kingdom has been occurring for many decades. As a result, many people in the UK were born in Kenya, or have Kenyan ancestry. Many Kenyan people who migrated to the UK are of South Asian extraction.

Background

Most Kenyans in the UK are ethnically South Asian Kenyans who, like those in Uganda, were expelled during the late 1960s and early 1970s. This community has a substantial cluster in Leicester and London. The most recent growth may now be coming from ethnically African Kenyans, mirroring wider trends across the continent of economic migration to the richer industrialised nations. There are also a small number of Kenyan-born people who are the children of British civil servants based there before the end of the Empire.

Demographics
The 2001 UK Census recorded 129,633 Kenyan-born British residents. The 2011 census recorded 135,966 Kenyan-born people resident in England, 1,526 in Wales, 2,743 in Scotland and 301 in Northern Ireland, making a UK total of 140,536. The equivalent UK figure in 2019 has been estimated at 121,000 by the Office for National Statistics.

The largest proportion of Kenyan-born British residents are found in the capital, London, where around half of the Kenyan-born population in Britain resides. There are also significant populations in the South East and the East Midlands.

Famous Britons born in Kenya

Academia, medicine and science
 Richard Dawkins, ethologist, biologist, writer
 Azim Nanji, academic
 Alan Rayner, biologist
 Sir Nilesh Samani, physician
 Sir Tejinder Virdee, physicist
 Chris Froome, Professional cyclist

Business, law and politics
 Michael Bear, former Lord Mayor of London
 Peter Hain, former Labour MP, cabinet minister and currently member of the House of Lords
 Baroness Prashar, businesswoman
 Lord Sheikh, businessman, Conservative politician

Music and the arts
 Khadambi Asalache, poet
 Kamara Bacchus, actress
 Kuljit Bhamra, musician
 Gurinder Chadha, film director
 Nitin Ganatra, actor
 Kulvinder Ghir, comedian
 Tania Harcourt-Cooze, model and actress
 Elspeth Huxley, author, journalist, broadcaster
 Viram Jasani, musician
 Michael Kuhn, film producer
 Charles Mnene, actor
 Deep Roy, actor, stuntman
 Roger Whittaker, musician
 Imran Yusuf, comedian
 Adrian Zagoritis, music producer and songwriter

Sport
 Roger Chapman, golfer
 Jamie Dalrymple, cricketer
 Chris Froome, racing cyclist
 Rajesh Maru, cricketer
 Derek Pringle, cricketer
 Peter Thackeray, cricketer
 Curtis Osano, footballer
 Victor Wanyama, footballer
 Simon Shaw, rugby union player
 Anne Wafula Strike, wheelchair racing

See also

Black British
British Mixed
British African-Caribbean community
Kenya–United Kingdom relations
Kenyans in Germany
Kenyan Australians
Kenyan Americans
Kenyan Canadians
Kenyans in France

References

External links

Kenyan
Immigration to the United Kingdom by country of origin